The names Battle of Martinique or Invasion of Martinique refer to a number of military operations that took place on or near the French island of Martinique in Caribbean Sea:

Battle of Martinique (1667), also known as "Harman's Martinican Bonfire", a battle between a British naval squadron under Sir John Harman, and a French merchant fleet (mostly ships of the French West India Company) destroyed at Fort Royal, Martinique
Invasion of Martinique (1674), an unsuccessful Dutch invasion of the island during the Franco-Dutch War
Invasion of Martinique (1759), an unsuccessful British invasion of the island during the Seven Years' War
Invasion of Martinique (1762), a successful British invasion of the island during the Seven Years' War
Battle of Martinique (1779), a naval action between British and French fleets during the American War of Independence resulting in a British victory
Battle of Martinique (1780), an inconclusive naval action between British and French fleets during the American War of Independence
Battle of Fort Royal, An engagement between British and French fleets off Martinique on 29 April 1781.
Battle of Martinique (1794), a successful British invasion of the island during the French Revolutionary Wars
Invasion of Martinique (1809), a successful British invasion of the island during the Napoleonic Wars